Department of Public Health Engineering is a government agency responsible for providing and maintaining water and sewage lines in Bangladesh and is located in Dhaka. The Department was headed by Chief Engineer and Md. Saifur Rahman is the present Chief Engineer of the Department.

History
The Department of Public Health Engineering was established in 1936 in East Bengal, British Raj. It is responsible for water and sewage lines in Bangladesh excluding the cities of Dhaka, Narayanganj and Chittagong which are managed by Water Supply and Sewerage Authority. Since 1993 the department has been responsible for monitoring arsenic in drinking water. The department is responsible for drilling drinking wells in rural areas of Bangladesh.

References

Government departments of Bangladesh
Government agencies of Bangladesh
1936 establishments in India
Organisations based in Dhaka